Can Boixeres is a station on line 5 of the Barcelona Metro.

The station is located on an open-air section of track between Carrer de l'Estronci and Camí de Can Boixeres, just south of the Ronda de Dalt, in L'Hospitalet de Llobregat. It was opened in 1976.

This station is one of Barcelona's few above-ground metro stations, although the platforms and rails are roofed. The single ticket hall, with one access, is located on the second storey.

There is a large train garage facility nearby.

Services

See also
Transport in L'Hospitalet de Llobregat

External links
 Can Boixeres at Trenscat.com

Railway stations in Spain opened in 1976
Barcelona Metro line 5 stations
Railway stations in L'Hospitalet de Llobregat